Prophete GmbH u. Co. KG is a German manufacturer for bicycles, e-bikes, scooters, and supply parts that traditionally trade under the Prophete brand name.

The company (including the subsidiary company Cycle Union) employ a staff of about 400 people at 4 production sites.

History 

The company started out in 1908 as a bicycle workshop based in Halle an der Saale, but at the end of World War II the Prophete family moved the company to Rheda-Wiedenbrück in West Germany and expanded the operation to include wholesaling and importation of bicycles. By the 1970s the company had become the main supplier of bicycles to German supermarkets and mail order houses which eventually led to the company starting to manufacture bicycle frames and other parts in its own factories in order to ensure stabler supplies.

In 1995 the company formed a subsidiary called SI-Zweirad-Vertriebs-GmbH in order to enter the market for small motorcycles and mopeds. Later that same year the company bought the rights to the Kreidler brand name and started importing and selling mopeds, motorcycles and quadbikes under the Kreidler and Rex names, however unlike their bicycles the mopeds and motorcycles were actually sourced from Asia.

The company hit some snags in 2003 when a number of their smaller two-stroke engined mopeds fell afoul of tighter EU emission regulations and the Kreidler brand name actually disappeared from some markets for a while. A new daughter company called Cycle Union was formed to handle all of the brands that Prophete had been distributing through specialised motorcycle and bicycle stores and Kreidler mopeds started appearing in shops again in 2007/2008. That company is based in Oldenburg, in addition to Kreidler it owns and operates brands such as Epple (bicycle manufacturer based in Memmingen, which Prophete bought in 2004), VSF Fahrradmanufaktur and Rabeneick in addition to distributing other brands. Cycle Union appears not to manufacture any bikes but rather sources them from Asian manufactures such as Jinan Qingqi.

Note that Prophete itself still makes and sells bicycles, but these are exclusively distributed through supermarkets, department stores and mail order houses rather than specialised retailers.

Brands

References

External links
Prophete homepage 
Kreidler homepage 
Cycle Union 

Cycle manufacturers of Germany
Manufacturing companies of Germany
Motorcycle manufacturers of Germany
Moped manufacturers
Vehicle manufacturing companies established in 1908
1908 establishments in Germany